The 1967 Newark riots were an episode of violent, armed conflict in the streets of Newark, New Jersey, United States. Taking place over a four-day period (between July 12 and July 17, 1967), the Newark riots resulted in at least 26 deaths and hundreds more serious injuries. Serious property damage, including shattered storefronts and fires caused by arson, left much of the city's built environment damaged or destroyed. At the height of the conflict, the National Guard was called upon to occupy the city with tanks and other military equipment, leading to iconic media depictions that were considered particularly shocking when shared in the national press. In the aftermath of the riots, Newark was quite rapidly abandoned by many of its remaining middle-class and affluent residents, as well as much of its white working-class population. This accelerated flight led to a decades-long period of disinvestment and urban blight, including soaring crime rates and gang activity. 

The Newark riots represented a flashpoint in a long-simmering conflict between elements of the city's then-growing African-American population, which had recently become a numerical majority, and its old political establishment, which remained dominated by members of non-African ethnic groups (especially Italian, Jewish, and Irish Americans) who had gained a political foothold in Newark during earlier generations. Endemic corruption in local government, combined with widespread racial prejudice, likely contributed to the city's failure, during the leadup to 1967, to include a more representative cross-section of the city's black population in its political power structure. Additionally, the Newark Riots were part of a larger national phenomenon, being among more than 150 race riots that occurred in the United States in the "Long Hot Summer of 1967". Some historians, focusing on the protest element of the conflict, have termed it the 1967 Newark Rebellion.

Background
In the decades leading up to the riots, deindustrialization and suburbanization were major contributors to changes in Newark's demographics. White middle-class residents left for other towns across North Jersey, in one of the largest examples of white flight in the country. Due to the legislation of the Servicemen's Readjustment Act of 1944, increasing numbers of white veterans, who had recently returned from fighting in World War II, emigrated from Newark to the suburbs where there was improved access to interstate highways, low-interest mortgages, and colleges. The outflow suburban sprawl of white veterans from Newark was rapidly replaced with an influx of black people moving into the Central Ward; blacks, however, faced discrimination in jobs and housing, ultimately making their lives more likely to fall into a cycle of poverty. By 1967, Newark was one of the United States' first majority-black cities, but was still controlled by white politicians.

Racial profiling, redlining, and lack of opportunity in education, training, and jobs led the city's African–American residents to feel powerless and disenfranchised. In particular, many felt they had been largely excluded from meaningful political representation and often subjected to police brutality. 

Newark established a Community Relations Bureau in their police department as early as March 1966.  Newark's Police Department director, Dominick Spina, rejected the budget request as he thought it would not be approved. This was much to the disliking to the residents of the Central Ward and it led to more tensions growing in the area as residents saw that in cases of police brutality on black residents, the police would not be held accountable.

Unemployment and poverty were very high, with the traditional manufacturing base of the city having been fully eroded and withdrawn by 1967. Further fueling tensions was the decision by the state of New Jersey to clear tenement buildings from a vast tract of land in the Central Ward to build the new University of Medicine and Dentistry. Thousands of low-income African American residents were displaced at a time when housing in Newark was aging and subjected to high tax rates.

Many African Americans, especially younger community leaders, felt they had remained largely disenfranchised in Newark, despite massive changes in the city's demographic makeup. Mayor Hugh J. Addonizio–– to date the last white mayor of the city–– took few steps to adjust to the changes and provide African Americans with civil leadership positions and better employment opportunities.

Despite being one of the first cities in the country to hire black police officers, the department's demographics remained at odds with the city's population, leading to poor relations between black people and the police department. Only 145 of the 1,322 police officers in the city were black (11%), mirroring national demographics, while the city grew to be over 50% black. Black leaders were increasingly upset that the Newark Police Department remained dominated by white officers, who would routinely stop and question black youths with or without provocation.

Inciting incident
The riots in Newark occurred 2 years after riots in Los Angeles and came at a time when racial tensions were high. Historians believe that the shrinking of the economy, increased unemployment, and a city with a majority African American population which was being run by white politicians increased tensions during that era.

This unrest and social change came to a head when two white Newark police officers, John DeSimone and Vito Pontrelli, arrested a black cab driver, John William Smith, on the evening of July12 at 9:40p.m. After signaling, Smith passed the double-parked police car, after which he was pursued and pulled over by the officers. He was arrested and beaten by the officers and taken to the 4th Police Precinct, where he was charged with assaulting the officers and making insulting remarks. 

Smith was driving on a revoked license at the time of his arrest, which was a factor. During the week of July 10, he was involved in eight car accidents and the police considered him to be someone who was hazardous. Smith was desperate for money and continued to do his work as a cab driver despite his license being revoked. He was originally from the Southern US and was a trumpet player there. After damaging his front two teeth he had moved to Newark to help pay his dental expenses. Smith got a job at a local taxi company, renting himself a one-room apartment in the Ironbound District along with a yellow taxi cab for $16.50 per day. During the night he was arrested, there were not many other riders on the street.

Residents of Hayes Homes, a large public housing project, saw an incapacitated Smith being dragged into the precinct, and a rumor was started that he had been beaten to death while in police custody. The rumor spread quickly, and a large crowd soon formed outside the precinct. At this point, accounts vary, with some saying that the crowd threw rocks through the precinct windows and police then rushed outside wearing hard hats and carrying clubs. Others say that police rushed out of their station first to confront the crowd, and then they began to throw bricks, bottles, and rocks.

A person who had witnessed the arrest of Smith contacted members of the Congress of Racial Equality, the United Freedom Party, and the Newark Community Union Project for further investigation; they were subsequently granted access to Smith's 4th Precinct holding cell. After seeing the injuries Smith sustained from the police, they demanded he be moved to Beth Israel Hospital in Newark, New Jersey, and were granted their request.

At least five police officers were struck by stones, according to one officer. Some residents went to City Hall and shouted angry protests. After midnight, false alarms caused fire engines to race around a six-block area along Belmont Avenue. Looters smashed windows of a few stores and threw merchandise onto sidewalks. According to police, liquor stores were the main target of looters. As the rumors were dispelled, things calmed.

Mayor Addonizio seemed unconcerned about the possibility of further violence occurring. On July 13 he held a meeting with Robert Curvin of CORE, an Essex County official named Earl Harris, a teacher named Harry Wheeler, and Duke Moore, a member of the UCC's board. They made three demands of the mayor:

Addonizio said that he needed 48 hours to consider these demands. When he left the meeting, he went to the Central Ward where he realized he would need to take action on them much sooner.  At close to the time when the meeting was ending, members of the Students for a Democratic Society's Newark branch distributed handwritten leaflets in the area indicating there would be a rally at the 4th Precinct at 7:30p.m.

Riots

July 13 
Governor Hughes and Addonizio assigned James Threatt, the Newark Human Rights Commission's (NHRC) executive director, to surveil the rally. Spina made sure that 500 officers were ready in case violence were to break out. The march/rally that was scheduled to have happened would occur. By 6:30p.m. a group of 10 picketers would form a line outside of the 4th precinct. By 7:30p.m. black residents who were angry and carrying homemade signs would march in front of Hayes Homes, a housing project that was located directly across the street from the 4th precinct. No police officer would be stationed outside of the precinct building when this protest initially occurred. Threatt would announce to the crowd in an attempt he thought would calm them down that an African American man on the police force, Lieutenant Eddie Williams would be promoted to captain. However he didn't mention that Addonizio was also planning on promoting four white lieutenants as well. Violence would begin within a few minutes after his announcement.

During the rally, an unknown woman smashed the windows of the 4th Precinct with a metal bar. Looting began soon after and spread quickly along Springfield Avenue, the neighborhood's business district. Molotov cocktails were thrown into shops and entire buildings soon caught fire. A car was burned and shortly after a policeman was injured by a flying brick. In response, shotguns were issued to some police officers.

July 14 
By midnight, looting spread to other areas in proximity to the march and all police were placed on emergency duty. At 1:00a.m. police were told to "fire if necessary." Addonizio called Governor Hughes asking for the New Jersey State Police at 2:20a.m. His request was accepted at 2:29a.m. with 300 state troopers being sent and activated exactly 9minutes later. At 2:30a.m. he called the Governor again saying that his city needed the New Jersey Army National Guard, who were activated 9 minutes later with a total of 3,464 being brought into the city. 

Detective Frederick Toto was shot while patrolling in the streets of Newark at 7:30p.m. on July14. He was patrolling the streets with Patrolman Butross when a sniper fired at them from a high-rise, striking Detective Toto. He was sent to St. Michael's Medical Center where surgeons unsuccessfully attempted life-saving surgery. Toto was the first police casualty of the riots. After he was shot at from the high-rise, over 200 National Guard soldiers combined with state and city police opened fire on the building where they believed the sniper to be positioned, arresting 25 people in response. Rufus Council was shot and killed a short time after Toto when he was leaving a steakhouse where he had eaten dinner. Isaac Harrison and Robert Lee Martin were both also killed in the vicinity of Toto's shooting. Toto's death attracted national attention to the riots in the city.

July 15–17 
Early on the evening of July15, a woman named Rebecca Brown was killed in a fusillade of bullets directed at the window of her second-floor apartment, leading to further backlash and discord from the community. By the sixth day, riots, looting, violence, and destruction had left a total of 16 civilians, 8 suspects, a police officer, and a firefighter dead; 353 civilians, 214 suspects, 67 police officers, 55 firefighters, and 38 military personnel injured; and 689 civilians and 811 suspects arrested and property damage is expected to have exceeded $10million.

Media coverage 
Photographer Bud Lee was in Newark along with Life reporter Dale Wittner during the riots. There, Lee took several grim photos of a police officer gunning down 24-year-old William Furr, who was caught in an act of stealing a six pack of beer from the ransacked Mack's Liquors store; both Lee and Wittner had earlier met Furr who barged into the latter's conversation with a Black Muslim man regarding the rioting situation. He also shot a photo of a 12-year-old civilian, Joe Bass Jr. who was bleeding on the ground after stray pellets from the policeman's shotgun blast that killed Furr accidentally struck him. Bass survived the wounds and his image became the cover of Life magazine on July 28, 1967.

Response 
The riots elicited a strong response from law enforcement organizations. 7,917 members of police and National Guard were deployed, leading to 1,465 arrests and 26 deaths. In an effort to contain the riots, every evening at 6:00p.m. the Bridge Street and Jackson Street Bridges, both of which span the Passaic River between Newark and Harrison, were closed until the next morning.

Further complicating matters was the fact that National Guard, State Police, and local police forces had difficulty coordinating their actions due to the three organizations communicating on three different assigned radio frequency ranges.

Aftermath and impact
While the riots are often cited as a major factor in the decline of Newark and its neighboring communities, longer-term racial, economic, and political forces contributed towards generating inner city poverty. By the 1960s and 1970s, as industry fled the city, so did the white middle class, leaving behind a poor population. During this same time, the population of many suburban communities in northern New Jersey expanded rapidly.

The riots caused about $10 million in damages ($ million today) and destroyed multiple plots, several of which are still covered in decay as of 2017.

The ratio of Newark officers respective to their ethnicity has increased as of 2000, when Newark was 52% black, 34% Latino, and 14% white, the Newark Police Department was 37% black, 27% Hispanic and 36% white. As of 2016, the force was 35% black, while the Latino portion had increased to 41%.

In popular culture
The riots were depicted in the 1997 Philip Roth novel American Pastoral as well as its 2016 film adaptation, directed by and starring Ewan McGregor, alongside Jennifer Connelly and Dakota Fanning.

The events are the setting of one section of the 2017 novel 4 3 2 1 by Paul Auster.

Revolution '67 is a feature-length documentary about the riots by Emmy-nominated, Newark-based filmmakers Marylou and Jerome Bongiorno. It premiered on PBS in 2007 as part of its series POV and examines the causes and outcome of the Newark 1967 riots.

The Sopranos episode "Down Neck" features a flashback in which Tony Soprano's mother, Livia Soprano, is watching the riots live on television.

In September 2021, a theatrical prequel to The Sopranos premiered, entitled The Many Saints of Newark, which is partially set during the riots.

See also

 Revolution '67
 New Community Corporation
 History of Newark, New Jersey
 List of incidents of civil unrest in the United States
 1967 Plainfield riots

References

Further reading
 
 Race, riots and reputation: Has N.J.'s largest city recovered?

External links
 1967 Newark Riots
 No Cause For Indictment: An Autopsy of Newark by Ron Porambo

Newark riots
History of Newark, New Jersey
Newark Riots, 1967
Newark
Urban decay in the United States
African-American history in Newark, New Jersey
Crime in the New York metropolitan area
Riots and civil disorder in New Jersey
July 1967 events in the United States
Police brutality in the United States
20th century in Newark, New Jersey
Long, hot summer of 1967